Catajana is a monotypic moth genus in the family Eupterotidae described by Embrik Strand in 1910. Its only species, Catajana bimaculata, described by Hermann Dewitz in 1879, is found in Angola and the Democratic Republic of the Congo.

References

Moths described in 1879
Janinae
Monotypic moth genera